Crow Hill is a summit located in Central New York Region of New York located in the Town of Kirkland, east of Chuckery Corners.

References

Mountains of Oneida County, New York
Mountains of New York (state)